Cantharellus formosus, commonly known as the Pacific golden chanterelle, is a fungus native to the Pacific Northwest region of North America. It is a member of the genus Cantharellus along with other popular edible chanterelles.  It was distinguished from the similar C. cibarius of Europe in the 1990s.  It is orange to yellow, meaty and funnel-shaped. On the underside of the smooth cap, it has gill-like ridges that run down onto its stipe, which tapers down seamlessly from the cap. The false gills often have a pinkish hue. It has a mild, sweet odor.  It is solitary to gregarious in coniferous forests, fruiting from July to December.

The Pacific golden chanterelle is the most important commercially harvested Cantharellus species in the Pacific Northwest.  This chanterelle has been designated Oregon's state mushroom, due to its economic value and abundance.

Description
In dry weather, the cap is medium orange yellow to light yellow brown, but wet weather may brighten the cap to brilliant to soft orange yellow. In low light conditions, caps may not develop the yellow pigmentation, resulting in salmon to rosy buff colors. The false gills may be yellow, salmon, buff, or even whitish depending on conditions, but are usually paler than the cap. The stem is colored similarly to the cap, and is either equal-width or tapering downwards. The spore print is a yellowish white color.

Taxonomy

E. J. H. Corner formally described C. formosus in 1966 from specimens collected on Vancouver Island in 1938.  Despite this publication, the name C. cibarius continued to be used to refer to golden chanterelles in the Pacific Northwest.  In 1997, Redhead et al. re-examined Corner's specimens, returned to the type locale, and collected new specimens, confirming the identity of C. formosus.  DNA analysis has since confirmed the species-level rank of C. formosus.

Distribution
Cantharellus formosus has been reported from British Columbia to California, and is particularly abundant in the conifer forests of Washington and Oregon.  It forms a mycorrhizal association with Douglas-fir and western hemlock, and has been shown to be more common in younger (40- to 60-year-old) forests than in old-growth forests.

Uses
The mushroom has a fruity smell and floral taste. It should be brushed clean but not washed before cooking. It can be tossed, stir-fried, and sautéed in butter or oil. It is commonly sold in grocery markets and restaurants.

Similar species

Several other species of chanterelle may be found in western North America:
C. californicus — large size, associated with oaks in California
C. cascadensis — bright yellow fading to white in center of cap, may have bulbous base of stem
C. cibarius var. roseocanus — brilliant orange-yellow color without pinkish hues, false gills not paler than cap
C. subalbidus — whitish overall color

Additionally, Hygrophoropsis aurantiaca, Chroogomphus tomentosus, and species in the genera Craterellus, Gomphus (namely G. floccosus and G. kauffmanii), Omphalotus (particularly the poisonous O. olivascens in California), and Polyozellus may have a somewhat similar appearance to C. formosus.

References

External links

formosus
Edible fungi
Fungi of Canada
Fungi of the United States
Fungi described in 1966
Fungi without expected TNC conservation status